is a Japanese professional shogi player ranked 7-dan.

Early life
Abe was born in Sakata, Yamagata on February 25, 1989. He learned how to play shogi when he was five years old from watching his father and older brother play each other. As a junior high school student, Abe finished runner-up in the Boy's Division of the 22st  in 2001 and later that same year entered the Japan Shogi Association's apprentice school at the rank of 6-kyū under the guidance of shogi professional .

Abe obtained professional status and the rank of 4-dan on October 1, 2009, after finishing second the 45th 3-dan League (April 2009September 2009) with a record of 13 wins and 5 losses.

Shogi professional
In October 2010. Abe won his first tournament since turning professional when he defeated amateur player Hakuyo Kaku  2 games to 1 to win the 41st .

Promotion history
Abe's promotion history is as follows:
 6-kyū: September 25, 2002
 4-dan: Occtober 1, 2009
 5-dan: November 1, 2011
 6-dan: November 5, 2015
 7-dan: April 22, 2016

Titles and other championships
Abe has yet to appear in a major title match, but he has won one non-major title championship.

Awards and honors
Abe received the Japan Shogi Association Annual Shogi Award for"Special Game of the Year" for the 2015 Shogi Year for his game against Yoshiharu Habu in the challenger tournament for the 41st Kiō title.

Note list

References

External links
ShogiHub: Professional Player Info · Abe, Kenjiro

Japanese shogi players
Living people
Professional shogi players
Professional shogi players from Yamagata Prefecture
1989 births
Shinjin-Ō